The Cayman Islands competed at the 2015 Pan American Games in Toronto, Ontario, Canada from July 10 to 26, 2015. For the first time ever the country had a national house at a multi-sport event. The offices of FUSE Marketing Group, in Downtown Toronto served as the location of the house.

Swimmer Brett Fraser was the flagbearer for the team during the opening ceremony.

Competitors
The following table lists Cayman Island's delegation per sport and gender.

Athletics

The Cayman Islands qualified two athletes. Originally the country had qualified more athletes including a 4x100 metres relay team. However organizers had to reduce the quota in athletics as too many athletes had qualified.

Men
Track

Beach volleyball

The Cayman Islands qualified a women's pair.

Gymnastics

The Cayman Islands qualified one female gymnast. This will be the first time ever the country has competed in the sport at the Pan American Games.

Artistic
Women

Qualification Legend: R = Qualified to apparatus final since two athletes per country can qualify for finals and United States and Brazil had reached the maximum number of athletes qualified into the finals.

Swimming

The Cayman Islands qualified two swimmers (one male and one female).

See also
Cayman Islands at the 2016 Summer Olympics

References

Nations at the 2015 Pan American Games
P
2015